Maraviglia is an Italian surname. Notable people with the surname include:

Giuseppe Maria Maraviglia (1617–1684), Italian Roman Catholic bishop
Lilia Maraviglia, Bulgarian actress
Maurizio Maraviglia (1878–1955), Italian politician and academic

See also
MSC Meraviglia, a cruise ship owned and operated by MSC Cruises

Italian-language surnames